Saint John's Church is a church on the island of Saint Helena and is part of the Diocese of St Helena. It is situated in the capital Jamestown, in the Upper part of town.

The church was built in 1862 and is similar in design to Saint Helena's Saint Paul's Cathedral, which was built in the 1850s. It is designated as a Grade I listed building, and is one of many listed buildings (a designation for buildings of historic or architectural merit) in Jamestown.

Parish
The church falls within the parish of St James (one of three parishes on the island), which consists of the historic Saint James' Church (situated in the lower part of town) and three daughter churches:
 Saint John's
 Saint Mary's, the Briars
 Saint Michael's, Rupert's Valley

See also
Saint Matthew, Hutt's Gate - another church built in 1862 on the island

References

External links
Diocese of Saint Helena Parish of St James

Church buildings in Saint Helena
Churches completed in 1862
Grade I listed buildings in Saint Helena
1862 establishments in the British Empire
Jamestown, Saint Helena